Sydney Gedge (16 October 1829 – 6 April 1923) was a British Conservative politician and prominent lay member of the Church of England.

Biography 
Born in North Runcton, Norfolk on 16 October 1829, he was the eldest son of the Rev. Sydney Gedge, and was educated at King Edward's School, Birmingham and Corpus Christi College, Cambridge. He graduated in 1854, and received a first class Moral Sciences Tripos. He married Augusta Herring in 1857. He was a Cambridge Apostle.

He became a solicitor, and senior partner in Gedge, Fisher & Gedge. The company became solicitors to the London School Board in 1870, and Gedge was solicitor to the board for twenty years.

Gedge first stood for election to parliament in 1880, but failed to be elected at Cambridge. Five years later he was the Conservative candidate for Luton, but again was unsuccessful. In 1886 he was elected as one of two Conservative Members of Parliament (MPs) for Stockport, but was defeated at the subsequent 1892 general election. He returned to the House of Commons in 1895 as member for Walsall, defeating the sitting Liberal Arthur Hayter. In 1900 Hayter regained the Walsall seat, ending Gedge's parliamentary career. In November 1900 he was elected a member of the London School Board. He was defeated when he was a candidate for the London County Council in 1901.

Gedge was deeply involved in the Church of England, being a diocesan lay reader of London and Rochester and a member of the House of Laymen of the General Synod. He was a governor of Ridley Hall, Wycliffe Hall, Westfield College for Women, and Christ's Hospital, and Chairman of Henley's Telegraph Works Co. He was also an enthusiastic member of the Church Missionary Society. He was a member of the Carlton Club and the Junior Constitutional Club.

He died at his home in Mitcham, Surrey on 6 April 1923, aged 93.

References

External links
 
 

1829 births
1923 deaths
Alumni of Corpus Christi College, Cambridge
UK MPs 1886–1892
UK MPs 1895–1900
Conservative Party (UK) MPs for English constituencies
Members of the London School Board
People educated at King Edward's School, Birmingham
Anglican lay readers
Members of the Parliament of the United Kingdom for Stockport